The Balgat massacre of 10 August 1978 was a mass shooting targeting 3 coffeehouses known with their left-wing customers in Çankaya, Ankara in which 5 died and 14 were injured. The massacre was ordered by Abdullah Çatlı. 2 people, Mustafa Pehlivanoğlu and İsa Armağan, were arrested related to the incident. Pehlivanoğlu was executed on 7 October 1980 and Armağan escaped from prison. He was caught in 1995 and was sentenced to 10 years of imprisonment. However, he was released after 7 years. According to some idealist sources, Mustafa Pehlivanoğlu was a victim of false accusation and had no connections to the incident.

References 

Political violence in Turkey
Mass murder in 1978
Massacres in 1978
Massacres in Turkey
Mass murder in Turkey
1970s in Ankara
1978 in Turkey
1978 murders in Turkey